Michael James Duckworth (born 28 April 1992) is an English professional footballer who plays as a right-back for  club York City. He has played in the English Football League for Hartlepool United, Fleetwood Town and Morecambe.

Early life and career

Early career
Duckworth was born in Rinteln, Lower Saxony, Germany and lived there for six months before being raised in Rawcliffe, York, England. He started playing for his local team in Rawcliffe aged five, before joining York City's youth team aged 10. Duckworth signed a two-year scholarship with York in May 2008 after graduating from the club's Centre of Excellence. However, he was released after failing to earn a professional contract in May 2010.

Duckworth moved into non-League football in October 2010 when signing for Harrogate Railway Athletic of the Northern Premier League Division One North. He signed for Bradford Park Avenue in August 2011 and made 24 appearances, scoring 6 goals, in the 2011–12 season as they won promotion to the Conference North via the Northern Premier League Premier Division play-offs. He made 43 appearances in 2012–13 and won the club's Supporters' Player of the Year and Players' Player of the Year awards.

Football League

Duckworth went on trial at League Two club Hartlepool United in July 2013 after being recommended to them by Bradford Park Avenue manager John Deacey. His trial was a success and he signed a month-to-month contract with Hartlepool on 22 August 2013. He made his professional debut two days later after playing the full 90 minutes in a 1–0 home defeat against Fleetwood Town. In September 2013, Duckworth was rewarded for his early season form by signing a new contract for a longer period to extend his stay at Victoria Park.

Duckworth signed for League One club Fleetwood Town on 17 June 2016. On 31 January 2017, he joined League Two club Morecambe on loan until the end of 2016–17.

Return to non-League
Duckworth signed for newly promoted National League club FC Halifax Town on 5 August 2017 on a one-year contract.

Duckworth re-signed for York City, with the club now in the National League North, on 13 August 2020.

Style of play
Having joined Bradford Park Avenue as a winger or a forward, he was converted by manager John Deacey into playing as an attacking right-back.

Career statistics

Honours
Individual
Bradford Park Avenue Supporters' Player of the Year: 2012–13
Bradford Park Avenue Players' Player of the Year: 2012–13

References

External links

Profile at the York City F.C. website

1992 births
Living people
People from Rinteln
Footballers from Lower Saxony
Footballers from York
English footballers
Association football defenders
York City F.C. players
Harrogate Railway Athletic F.C. players
Bradford (Park Avenue) A.F.C. players
Hartlepool United F.C. players
Fleetwood Town F.C. players
Morecambe F.C. players
FC Halifax Town players
Northern Premier League players
National League (English football) players
English Football League players